Hyalopontius is a genus of crustaceans belonging to the monotypic family Megapontiidae.

The species of this genus are found in Western Europe, Arctic regions.

Species:

Hyalopontius alatus 
Hyalopontius boxshalli 
Hyalopontius cinctus 
Hyalopontius enormis 
Hyalopontius hulsemannae 
Hyalopontius pleurospinosus 
Hyalopontius roei 
Hyalopontius spinatus 
Hyalopontius typicus

References

Crustaceans